Dotalabrus aurantiacus, Castelnau's wrasse, is a species of wrasses native to the Indian Ocean coasts of Australia. It is the type species of its genus. The type locality is Adelaide, St. Vincent Gulf, South Australia.

See also 
 List of marine animals of Australia (temperate waters)

References 

aurantiacus
Fish described in 1872
Fish of Australia
Taxa named by François-Louis Laporte, comte de Castelnau